Petrus Hendrikus "Piet" van Zeil (3 August 1927 – 10 November 2012) was a Dutch politician of the defunct Catholic People's Party (KVP) and later the Christian Democratic Appeal (CDA) party and trade union leader.

Van Zeil worked as a office clerk for Van Gend & Loos from April 1944 until May 1951 and as a trade union leader for the Dutch Trade Unions association (NVV) from May 1951 until February 1972 serving as General-Secretary from August 1968 until February 1972. Van Zeil served on the Municipal Council of Hillegom from April 1966 until May 1974.

Van Zeil became a Member of the House of Representatives after Gerard Veringa was appointed as a Member of the Council of State, taking office on 1 February 1972 serving as a frontbencher chairing the parliamentary committee for Kingdom Relations and spokesperson for Transport, Aviation, Kingdom Relations and deputy spokesperson for Social Affairs. Van Zeil also served as Chairman of the Catholic People's Party from 5 April 1975 until 27 September 1980. After the election of 1981 Van Zeil was appointed as State Secretary for Economic Affairs the Cabinet Van Agt II, taking office on 11 September 1981. The Cabinet Van Agt II fell just seven months into its term on 12 May 1982 after months of tensions in the coalition and continued to serve in a demissionary capacity until the first cabinet formation of 1982 when it was replaced by the caretaker Cabinet Van Agt III with Van Zeil continuing as State Secretary for Economic Affairs, taking office on 29 May 1982. Van Zeil was also appointed as State Secretary for Social Affairs and Employment and dual served in those positions, taking office on 12 June 1982. After the election of 1982 Van Zeil returned as a Member of the House of Representatives, taking office on 16 September 1982. Following the cabinet formation of 1982 Van Zeil continued as State Secretary for Economic Affairs in the Cabinet Lubbers I, taking office on 5 November 1982. After the election of 1986 Van Zeil again returned as a Member of the House of Representatives, taking office on 3 June 1986. Following the cabinet formation of 1986 Van Zeil per his own request asked not to be considered for cabinet post in the new cabinet as he was nominated as Mayor of Heerlen, he resigned as State Secretary for Economic Affairs and as a Member of the House of Representatives on 22 June 1986 and was installed as Mayor, serving from 1 July 1986 until 1 September 1992.

Van Zeil semi-retired after spending 20 years in national politics and became active in the private sector and public sector and occupied numerous seats as a corporate director and nonprofit director on several boards of directors and supervisory boards (Netherlands Bible Society, Transnational Institute, and the Catholic Scouts) and served on several state commissions and councils on behalf of the government (Cadastre Agency, Public Pension Funds PFZW and KPN).

Van Zeil was known for his abilities as a debater and negotiator. Van Zeil continued to comment on political affairs until his death at the age of 85.

Decorations

References

External links

Official
  P.H. (Piet) van Zeil Parlement & Politiek

 
 

 

 

 

 
 

1927 births
2012 deaths
Catholic People's Party politicians
Chairmen of the Catholic People's Party
Christian Democratic Appeal politicians
Commanders of the Order of Leopold II
Dutch corporate directors
Dutch nonprofit directors
Dutch political consultants
Dutch Roman Catholics
Dutch trade union leaders
Grand Officers of the Order of Orange-Nassau
Knights Commander of the Order of St Gregory the Great
Knights of the Holy Sepulchre
Knights of the Order of the Netherlands Lion
Mayors of Heerlen
Members of the House of Representatives (Netherlands)
Members of the Social and Economic Council
Municipal councillors in South Holland
Officers Crosses of the Order of Merit of the Federal Republic of Germany
Officiers of the Légion d'honneur
People from Heerlen
People from Hillegom
State Secretaries for Economic Affairs of the Netherlands
State Secretaries for Social Affairs of the Netherlands
20th-century Dutch businesspeople
20th-century Dutch politicians